The Avalanche–Red Wings brawl was a large-scale on-ice melee that occurred March 26, 1997, at Joe Louis Arena in Detroit, Michigan, between two National Hockey League (NHL) rivals: the Colorado Avalanche and Detroit Red Wings. The brawl, which has been nicknamed Bloody Wednesday, Fight Night at the Joe and Brawl in Hockeytown, stemmed from a previous on-ice incident between the two teams during the 1996 Western Conference Finals. The game featured 18 fighting major penalties and 144 minutes in penalties.

Previous incident
In Game 6 of the 1996 Western Conference Finals, Avalanche right winger Claude Lemieux checked Red Wings center Kris Draper from behind, driving Draper's face into the boards.

The hit sent Draper out of the game and into the hospital with a broken jaw, shattered cheek and orbital bone which required reconstructive surgery involving his jaw being wired shut and numerous stitches. The Avalanche would upset the Red Wings in six games, eventually winning the Stanley Cup. After the traditional handshakes that take place after a playoff series, former Red Wings winger Dino Ciccarelli said of Lemieux, "I can't believe I shook this guy's friggin' hand after the game; that pisses me right off."

Brawls
In the next regular season, although the two teams had played each other three times without serious incident, this fourth meeting on the night of March 26 was different, with nine fights in the game. 

Prior to the game, Red Wings coach Scotty Bowman used Lemieux's hit on Draper and his lack of remorse as a rallying cry in order to get his team to add a physical edge to their game. On the day of the game, The Detroit News printed a "wanted" poster of Lemieux with a prison number under his photo under the headline "A Time For Revenge", and compared Lemieux to a carjacker.

As tensions mounted early in the first period, defencemen Brent Severyn (Avalanche) and Jamie Pushor (Red Wings) fought at 4:45 of the first period, followed by a fight between forwards Kirk Maltby (Red Wings) and Rene Corbet (Avalanche) at 10:14 where Maltby dropped Corbet.

The major melee ensued at the 18:22 mark, leading to the third fight. Shortly after a collision between Red Wing center Igor Larionov and Avalanche forward Peter Forsberg where Forsberg knocked Larionov onto his backside away from the play in front of the Red Wings bench, Wings enforcer Darren McCarty seized the chance to avenge his Grind Line teammate by escaping from the grasps of Adam Foote and a linesman and turning to cold-cock Lemieux. McCarty laid many blows on Lemieux, who fell to the ice and covered his head; McCarty managed to land a few more punches, drag Lemieux to the boards and knee him in the head before the two were separated by officials.

Seeing what McCarty was doing to Lemieux, Avalanche goaltender Patrick Roy skated out of his net to defend his teammate, but was intercepted by Red Wing forward Brendan Shanahan, who hit Roy with a vicious clothesline that sent him sprawling to the ice. While Shanahan and defenceman Adam Foote tangled, Wings goaltender Mike Vernon went out to center ice to try and grab Foote off of Shanahan. Roy saw this going on and got Vernon's attention by pulling him off his teammate, which ended up escalating to a fight when Vernon and Roy dropped their masks, gloves, and blockers. While the fight between Roy and Vernon wound down, McCarty dragged Lemieux's body to where Draper was standing on the Red Wings bench. As a result of the third brawl of the first period, Forsberg and Larionov each received matching minor penalties for roughing; Roy and Vernon were each assessed minor penalties for roughing Shanahan and Foote, respectively, and major penalties for fighting each other, and McCarty received a double-minor for roughing Lemieux, giving Colorado a power play. Vernon was so convinced that he was ejected that he went to his locker stall only to have an official race in to tell Vernon to put his gear back on and get back in net. Forsberg aggravated an injury in the scrum with Larionov and would not return, and the McCarty/Lemieux incident left patches of blood on the ice that were visible before the ice was resurfaced by the Zamboni; blood also ended up on the boards near the Red Wings bench. There was even more blood during this brawl, when blood started to gush out from a cut on Roy's forehead.

Fifteen seconds after the Roy/Vernon fight, Avalanche winger Adam Deadmarsh and Red Wing defenceman Vladimir Konstantinov would drop the gloves in another fight for the final fight in the first period.

There would be five more fights (and four stoppages) in the second period: a fight between Shanahan and Foote four seconds into the second period, simultaneous fights between Avalanche winger Mike Keane and Red Wing winger Tomas Holmstrom, which occurred for the most part on the ice, and between Severyn and Red Wing defenceman Aaron Ward at 3:34 in (Severyn and Ward were ejected for a secondary fight), McCarty and Deadmarsh at 7:24 (McCarty also received a roughing), and between Pushor and Avalanche defenceman Uwe Krupp at 11:26.

When the third period ended, the score was tied 5–5. Incidentally, it was McCarty who scored the winner against Roy 39 seconds into overtime, assisted by Shanahan and Larionov.

Aftermath
Mike Vernon, who won his 300th career game, believed the brawl-filled game "brought the Red Wings together" in time for the playoffs. Red Wings broadcaster Ken Kal surmised that the game was a turning point as far as the team's success went. Colorado head coach Marc Crawford, meanwhile, wondered why McCarty did not receive a game misconduct for his largely one-sided instigation and subsequent fight with Lemieux (McCarty received a double-minor for roughing for that incident, and also received a fighting major later in the game). Subsequently, Avalanche right winger Mike Keane criticized Draper for having McCarty fight on his behalf.

A similar free-for-all between the teams took place on May 22, during Game 4 of the Western Conference Finals at Joe Louis Arena, when during a penalty-filled game, Crawford was seen screaming obscenities at Red Wings head coach Scotty Bowman across the glass separating the two benches. Bowman then told Crawford, "I knew your father before you did, and I don't think he'd be very proud of how you're acting." The Wings won that game 6–0 and went on to win the series in six games, en route to capturing the Stanley Cup. Crawford was fined $10,000 for the tirade.

The next season during a game on November 11, 1997 between the two teams, McCarty and Lemieux began to throw punches seconds after the opening faceoff, much to the delight of the Joe Louis Arena crowd.

On April 1, 1998, Joe Louis Arena was the site of another Avs-Wings brawl. This time Patrick Roy challenged and then squared off with Chris Osgood at center ice. The referees called more severe penalties this time, as Roy and Osgood both received minor, major, misconduct, and game misconduct penalties. The two teams combined for 46 penalties totaling 228 minutes. The Wings won the game 2–0, and would go on to win the second consecutive Stanley Cup.

The game and brawl is considered a defining moment in modern hockey history. However, as players began to leave each team through free agency, trades or retirements, the rivalry began to die down.

A game between the Red Wings and Avalanche at the Pepsi Center on March 23, 2002, broke into a brawl (much smaller than the previous two) when Kirk Maltby came into Patrick Roy's net and Roy took exception. The brawl continued when Red Wings goaltender Dominik Hasek skated down the length of the ice to confront Roy but tripped on a discarded stick, causing him to crash into and knock over Roy. Infuriated, Roy threw off his gloves and mask to fight as Hasek did the same, but the two were restrained by the officials, thus preventing Roy from fighting a third Red Wing goaltender since 1997. The Red Wings would also go on to win this game 2–0, and win the 2002 Stanley Cup a couple of months later.

The captains of the two teams for this game, Joe Sakic for the Avalanche, and Steve Yzerman for the Red Wings, are both currently serving as the general managers for their teams.

On March 26, 2022, 25 years after this brawl, McCarty and Lemieux met again at a local bar in Michigan to rewatch this game.

ESPN released an E:60 documentary, Unrivaled, about the rivalry, specifically about this game, on June 26, 2022.

Box score
 Avalanche–Red Wings brawl box score

References

1996–97 NHL season
National Hockey League brawls
1997
1997
1997 in Detroit
1997 in sports in Michigan
March 1997 sports events in the United States